Al Jazeera Documentary Channel (Arabic: الجزيرة الوثائقية) is a pan-Arab satellite Arabic language film and documentary channel and a branch of the Al Jazeera Media Network based in Doha, Qatar.

It was launched at 12:00 GMT on 1 January 2007. It aims to provide viewers with high quality documentary films. These films cover topics including historical, scientific, political, artistic, and travel issues.

The channel produces 15% of broadcast material in-house, while obtaining the rest from Arab and global producers. It also produces documentaries for flagship Al Jazeera and participates in commissioning and producing documentaries for other Al Jazeera channels like Al Jazeera English under the Al Jazeera World documentary-strand. The channel is housed in a separate building on the Al Jazeera Media Network block of Qatar Radio and Television Corporation complex in Wadi Al Sail West within Doha, Qatar.

As the Al Jazeera Documentary Channel is Arabic-speaking, it primarily produces content for Arab viewers. The channel is said to focus in four areas: Informatics, Awareness, Technical and Interestingness.

Informatics: To provide new information to viewers in the areas under discussion in the movies.

Technical: The drafting of technical and quality required in the global offering of movies to respect the visual and aesthetic taste of the viewer, and also to respect the technical standards of the nature of this kind of art documentary.

Interestingness: Raising the level of product supply to in the case as a movie follow-up is the case for each of the fun watching documentaries.

The Manager of Al Jazeera Documentary Channel is Ahmed Mahfouz.

Programming
Al Jazeera Documentary Channel concentrates on presenting documentaries from the following five fields:

 History / Archaeology
 News / Current Affairs / Politics
 Discovery / Exploration / Ethnology
 Science / Technology
 Health / Wellness

Frequencies

See also
 The Crusades, An Arab Perspective

References

External links
 Official website 
 Programme Schedule
 More information about Al Jazeera Documentary Channel

Al Jazeera
Television channels and stations established in 2007
Arabic-language television stations
Documentary television channels